Deepak Sumnath (born 17 January 1994) is a former Indian professional footballer who played as a left-back for Mohun Bagan in the I-League. He also had stints with Calcutta Football League clubs Bhawanipore and Mohammedan.

Club career
Sumnath began his career with I-League club Mohun Bagan, making his debut for the club on 11 February 2012 against Mumbai. He came on as an 18th minute substitute for Nallappan Mohanraj as Mohun Bagan won 2–1. In 2013, Sumnath moved to Calcutta Football League side Bhawanipore on loan before joining them permanently in 2015.

Later in 2015, Sumnath joined fellow Calcutta Football League club Mohammedan.

International career
In March 2015, Sumnath was called-up to the India under-23 side which took part in the 2016 AFC U-23 Championship qualifiers. He made his debut for the side on 27 March in India's opening match against Uzbekistan, starting in the 0–2 defeat. He proceeded to then start India's last two matches as they finished third in their group and failed to advance to the tournament proper.

References

External links
 Profile at Eurosport
 Sumnath included in Mohun Bagan past squads

1994 births
Living people
Indian footballers
Association football defenders
Mohun Bagan AC players
Bhawanipore FC players
Mohammedan SC (Kolkata) players
I-League players
Calcutta Football League players
Footballers from Punjab, India
India youth international footballers